Ernest Watkins (1902–1982) was a provincial politician and author from Alberta, Canada.

Ernest Watkins may also refer to:

 Ernie Watkins (footballer, born 1898) (1898–1976), English footballer
 Ernest Watkins (footballer, born 1878), Welsh international footballer